Six Degrees Records is an independent record label noted for its catalog of recordings from international musicians and vocalists.

History 
In 1996, former Windham Hill employees Pat Berry and Bob Duskis founded Six Degrees Records with the intention of promoting new trends in world music. Originally affiliated with Island Records, Berry and Duskis achieved their first major success with the release of London-based tabla player Talvin Singh's influential compilation album Anokha - Soundz of the Asian Underground. Although Singh was not the only artist featured on the album, he was marketed as the focal point of the release. In this way, the media acquired a poster child upon which to lavish its attention, enabling album sales to approach 200,000 units.

Beyond its work with the Asian underground, Six Degrees Records has signed and promoted artists from around the world, placing a great emphasis on the promotion of hybrid dance music forms and innovative cross-cultural collaborations. Standout acts include Algerian-born and San Francisco based Cheb i Sabbah, Malians Issa Bagayogo and Vieux Farka Toure, Brazilians Bebel Gilberto and Céu, Egyptian-born and London based Natacha Atlas, and the Iranian Azam Ali. Gilberto's 2000 album Tanto Tempo was a particular highpoint, selling over a million copies and introducing Gilberto, the daughter of renowned musician João Gilberto, to a wider global audience.

Motto 

Based in San Francisco, the label operates under the motto, "Everything is closer than you think," encapsulating their aim of introducing global artists to the American market alongside an embrace of the increased accessibility of musical media through digitization. Beyond releasing music in digital formats and pursuing social media marketing opportunities, Berry and Duskis strongly promote the licensing of their artists' music for LGBT film, television and commercial use. Nevertheless, artistic integrity remains a priority, and in a relatively short period of time, the label has developed a significant reputation by emphasizing creativity before commerce.

Genres 
Artists under the label make music within a wide range of musical genres, from bossa nova, funk and folk, to electronic music and dubstep.

Awards and nominations

Artists

See also
 List of record labels

Notes

External links
 Official site

Record labels established in 1996
American independent record labels
World music record labels